Noorpur Stupas is an archaeological site in Gilgit, Gilgit-Baltistan, Pakistan.

References

Archaeological sites in Gilgit-Baltistan
History of Gilgit-Baltistan
Monuments and memorials in Gilgit-Baltistan
Buildings and structures in Gilgit-Baltistan